The Buenos Aires Argentina Temple is the 39th operating temple of the Church of Jesus Christ of Latter-day Saints (LDS Church), located in Ciudad Evita, near Buenos Aires, Argentina.

History
LDS Church leaders announced plans to build a temple in Buenos Aires in April 1980.  Three years later, ground was broken and the site was dedicated by Bruce R. McConkie.  After the building's completion an open house was held from December 17–24, 1985.  Because of the location, visitors traveling from the airport to downtown Buenos Aires drive right past the temple.

Thomas S. Monson presided over the temple dedication on January 17, 1986.

The temple closed for a renovation and expansion that added two smaller wings to the temple, set at angles to the existing structure. The renovated temple was rededicated September 9, 2012 by Henry B. Eyring, First Counselor in the church's First Presidency. It reopened September 11, 2012.

In 2020, the Buenos Aires Argentina Temple was temporarily closed temporarily during the year in response to the coronavirus pandemic.

See also

 Comparison of temples of The Church of Jesus Christ of Latter-day Saints
 List of temples of The Church of Jesus Christ of Latter-day Saints
 List of temples of The Church of Jesus Christ of Latter-day Saints by geographic region
 Temple architecture (Latter-day Saints)
 The Church of Jesus Christ of Latter-day Saints in Argentina

References

External links
 
Buenos Aires Argentina Temple Official site
Buenos Aires Argentina Temple at ChurchofJesusChristTemples.org

20th-century Latter Day Saint temples
Buildings and structures in Buenos Aires Province
La Matanza Partido
Religious buildings and structures in Argentina
Christianity in Buenos Aires
Religious buildings and structures completed in 1986
Temples (LDS Church) in Latin America
Temples (LDS Church) in Argentina
The Church of Jesus Christ of Latter-day Saints in Argentina
1986 establishments in Argentina